Van Leeuwen may refer to:

 Van Leeuwen (surname), a Dutch surname
 Van Leeuwen Ice Cream, an American ice cream parlor chain
 Van Leeuwen Pipe and Tube Group, a Dutch steel distributor
 Bohr–Van Leeuwen theorem, a physics theorum